The 1921 Copa del Rey Final was the 21st final of the Spanish cup competition, the Copa del Rey. The final was played at San Mamés, in Bilbao, on 8 May 1921. Athletic Bilbao beat Athletic Madrid 4–1 courtesy of two braces from José María Laca and Domingo Acedo, a victory that assured their eighth domestic cup title.

The match was the first meeting between the 'two Athletics' who had begun as the same club, with the parent in Bilbao and the subsidiary in Madrid.  The clubs had been growing apart, and after this match, they formally split, one of the main reasons being the Athletic Madrid president Julián Ruete having agreed with Athletic Bilbao's request to move the final from its original venue in Seville to Bilbao (due to bad feeling over the manner in which Sevilla FC had been disqualified to the Basques' benefit), which Athletic Madrid fans saw as an unnecessary deference.

It was Athletic Madrid's first final in the competition after they unexpectedly, but convincingly defeated Real Unión in the semi-finals. It was also the last match played by Athletic Bilbao's well-known forward Pichichi, who retired soon afterwards and died the following year.

Match details

See also
Same finalists:
1956 Copa del Generalísimo Final
1985 Copa del Rey Final
2012 UEFA Europa League Final

References

External links
linguasport.com
RSSSF.com
Athletic Bilbao

1921
Copa
Atlético Madrid matches
Athletic Bilbao matches
May 1921 sports events